"Eboshi peak", with Eboshi being a Japanese hat, is a  high mountain in the extreme north of the Japanese main island, Honshu, at the northern end of the Ōu Mountain Range.

Its peak forms the boundary between the communities of Hiranai in the northwest, Noheji in the northeast, and Tōhoku in the south, all located in Aomori Prefecture.

A radio repeater was built on the mountain in 2007 for the three municipalities listed above to broadcast the following digital television stations: NHK, NHK Kyōiku, RAB Aomori, ATV Aomori Television, and ABA Aomori.

The mountain is a popular destination among casual hikers due to its gentle slope and its plant diversity a popular destination. Its north side is also accessible by a road.

References

Mountains of Aomori Prefecture
Hiranai, Aomori
Noheji, Aomori
Tōhoku, Aomori